Harewood, West Yorkshire is a civil parish in the metropolitan borough of the City of Leeds, West Yorkshire, England.  It contains 104 listed buildings that are recorded in the National Heritage List for England. Of these, four are listed at Grade I, the highest of the three grades, seven are at Grade II*, the middle grade, and the others are at Grade II, the lowest grade.  The parish contains the country house, Harewood House, and its grounds, the village of Harewood, and the surrounding countryside.  The house is listed, together with many buildings in its grounds, including All Saints' Church.  Most of the houses in the village are listed, together with associated structures, and in the surrounding area the listed buildings include farmhouses and farm buildings, an ancient meeting stone, a ruined castle, bridges, tombs and headstones in the churchyard, milestones, and a guidestone.


Key

Buildings

References

Citations

Sources

 

Lists of listed buildings in West Yorkshire